List of airports and heliports in Macau:
Also see :Category:Airports in Macau and List of airports by ICAO code: VM

The Macau Special Administrative Region of the People's Republic of China, commonly known as Macau or Macao, is a small territory on the southern coast of the People's Republic of China (PRC). The administrative power over Macau was transferred from Portugal to the PRC in December 1999, and it is now one of two special administrative regions of the PRC, together with Hong Kong.

History

In the past there were seaplanes serving the territory.

Airport

There is only one airport located within Macau and began service in 1995.

Heliports and helipads
There are two heliports in Macau.

See also
Transport in Macau
Wikipedia: Airline destination lists: Asia#Macau

External links
Lists of airports in Macau:
Great Circle Mapper
FallingRain.com
Aircraft Charter World

 
Macau
Macau
Macau
Airports
Airports, Macau